Mia Matilda Carlsson (born Karlsson 12 March 1990 in Skånes-Fagerhult) is a Swedish soccer player (defender) who has played for Kristianstads DFF since 2009. Prior to the 2018 season she signed on for another year.

Prior to the 2015 season Carlsson signed a three year contract with Kristianstads DFF. During the season of 2016 she was named "Player of the year" by the Swedish women referees (SEDD).
Prior to the 2018 season she signed on for another year.
By the end of the 2016 season she had played 155 professional games in the Damallsvenskan for Kristianstad, all of them as a starter.

She made her debut with the Swedish national team at 17, scoring two goals during that season. She also represented Sweden on the U19 and U23 national teams and is currently on the first team.

References

External links 
 

1990 births
Living people
Sweden women's international footballers
Swedish women's footballers
Women's association football defenders
Kristianstads DFF players
People from Örkelljunga Municipality
Damallsvenskan players
Sportspeople from Skåne County